For the Good Times may refer to:
For the Good Times (song), a 1968 song by Kris Kristofferson, recorded by several artists
For the Good Times (Ray Price album), 1970
For the Good Times (Chet Atkins album), 1971
For the Good Times (Dean Martin album), 1971
For the Good Times (Rusty Bryant album), 1973
For the Good Times (The Little Willies album), 2012
For the Good Times, the title of at least four compilation albums by Kenny Rogers